"Face to the Floor" is the first single from Chevelle's album, Hats Off to the Bull. According to the band, it is a "pissed off, angry song about people who got taken by the Ponzi scheme that Bernie Madoff had for all those years." "Face to the Floor" reached No. 1 on Mediabase's Active Rock chart, and the Mainstream Rock Tracks chart, their first No. 1 single since "Vitamin R (Leading Us Along)" and it also stayed No.1 for 12 weeks on the chart. It was also the band's last top-ten single (to date) on the Alternative Songs chart, where it reached No. 7. The song has been described as alternative metal and post-grunge.

Critical reception
Billboard rated "Face to the Floor" 80 out of 100, saying ""Floor" delivers nearly four minutes of the cathartic alt-metal fans have come to expect from Chevelle." Liz Ramanand of Loudwire gave the song 4 out of 5 stars, praising it for its consistently "heavy, catchy guitar riffs".

Charts

Weekly charts

Year-end charts

Certifications

References

2011 singles
Chevelle (band) songs
2011 songs
Songs written by Sam Loeffler
Songs written by Pete Loeffler